The Good Mother is a 1988 American drama film and an adaptation of Sue Miller's novel of the same name.  Directed by Leonard Nimoy, the film stars Diane Keaton and Liam Neeson in the leading roles. The Good Mother explores feelings and beliefs about children's exposure to adult sexuality and challenges society's growing reliance upon courts to settle complex private and ethical matters.

Plot
Anna Dunlap (Keaton), is a Boston piano teacher, working part-time at a college laboratory who recently divorced her husband Brian (James Naughton) and has custody of her six-year-old daughter Molly (Asia Viera). Soon, Anna meets and falls in love with Leo (Neeson), an Irish sculptor who helps her to find true passion and fulfillment. He is a nice guy, and has a stable relationship with Anna. Molly is soon exposed to their sexual relationship. One day, Molly sees Leo naked in the bathroom. She points at his private part and asks what it is. He tells her and she asks if she can touch it. He says okay and she puts her little hand on it for a second. However, children being children, Molly talks to Brian about her experience with Leo. Brian accuses Leo of sexually molesting Molly and sues Anna for custody of their daughter. Then, Leo starts facing charges of child molestation, and Anna learns that she may lose custody of Molly to Brian. Leo finally clears himself out after explaining the mistake, that he thought it was in keeping with Anna's parenting, since she had bathed with Molly and was very open with her. A counselor agrees that Leo should have known better but he believes that Molly hasn't been abused and is a very well adjusted and happy child, particularly with Anna and Leo. In the end the judge gives custody to Brian and Anna's relationship with Leo ends. She does not fight for her child although an appeal was an option. She only sees Molly on alternate weekends and holidays. One of her loves was taken away and the other she pushed away.

Cast

Reception
The film received mixed reviews. On Rotten Tomatoes the film has an approval rating of 50% based on reviews from 12 critics.

References

External links
 
 
 

1988 films
1988 romantic drama films
American romantic drama films
Films scored by Elmer Bernstein
Films shot in Toronto
Films directed by Leonard Nimoy
Touchstone Pictures films
Films about mother–daughter relationships
1980s English-language films
1980s American films